Necromancer is a 1983 board game published by Steve Jackson Games.

Gameplay
Necromancer is a game in which the players are wizards who can control the undead.

Reception
Kevin Frey reviewed Necromancer in Space Gamer No. 71. Frey commented that "Overall, Necromancer is action-packed, fast-moving, and ever-changing.  It is a unique game which most gamers should find exciting to play."

References

Board games introduced in 1983
Steve Jackson Games games